One Night in Transylvania (Hungarian: Egy éjszaka Erdélyben) is a 1941 Hungarian historical comedy film directed by Frigyes Bán and starring Zita Szeleczky, Mária Lázár and Antal Páger. It was based on the play Alterego by István Asztalos. It was screened at the Venice Film Festival.

Cast
 Zita Szeleczky as Alvinczy Krisztina 
 Mária Lázár as Mária Terézia 
 Antal Páger as II.József 
 Mária Mezei as Henriette grófnõ
 István Nagy as Kléber kapitány 
 Miklós Hajmássy as Kancellár 
 György Kürthy as Erdélyi gubernátor 
 Ibolya Bilinszky as Udvarhölgy 
 Aranka Gazdy as Parasztasszony 
 Gyula Kompóthy as Fõkomornyik

References

Bibliography
 Cunningham, John. Hungarian Cinema: From Coffee House to Multiplex. Wallflower Press, 2004.
 Rozenblit, Judson. Constructing Nationalities in East Central Europe. Berghahn Books, 2005.

External links

1941 films
1940s Hungarian-language films
Films directed by Frigyes Bán
Hungarian films based on plays
Films set in Transylvania
1940s historical comedy films
Hungarian black-and-white films
Films set in the 18th century
Hungarian historical comedy films
1941 comedy films